The Harcourt Street Railway Line was a railway line that ran from Harcourt Street in Dublin through the southern suburbs to Bray. It was one of the Dublin and South Eastern Railway's two northern main lines, the other to Westland Row.

History
Following the success of the Dublin and Kingstown Railway (D&KR), which opened on 17 December 1834, proposals for a second commuter railway were put forward. These plans proposed the building of a  railway from Bray, which opened on 10 July 1854 to initially terminate at Harcourt Road. (Harcourt Street Station was not built until 1859). The building of the line was carried out by two railway companies: The Dublin, Wicklow and Wexford Railway (DW&WR), who built the line from Dundrum to Bray and the Dublin, Dundrum and Rathfarnham Railway (DD&RR), who were to build the line from Harcourt Street to Dundrum. The latter failed to do so, and the DW&WR took over the line works.

On 14 February 1900, a train from Enniscorthy failed to stop and went through the buffers and the end wall of the station,  sending debris over Hatch Street. Nobody was killed, though the driver, William Hyland, had his right arm amputated at the scene. Another serious accident occurred on 23 December 1957 when two trains collided in thick fog just south of Dundrum station. The first train had slowed to a walking pace because of a cow on the line. The second train was allowed into the same section of track due to an error by the signalman. Its driving cab was completely destroyed in the collision and the driver, Andrew Larkin, was killed instantly.

Drumm battery powered 2-car sets were in service between 1932 and 1949. 
In the 1950s, diesel railcars gradually replaced steam in an effort to improve journey times as many passengers had by then forsaken the line due to a significant increase in private car ownership. CIE were also rapidly expanding their then new bus services in and around the railway.

Route
The  route, which was double tracked by 1862, ran south, initially from a temporary terminus on Harcourt Road. It served the intermediate stations of Dundrum, Stillorgan, Carrickmines and Shankill. The new Harcourt Street station opened on 7 February 1859, along with a temporary platform at Foxrock.

Further new stations followed; Milltown (1860), Foxrock (1861) and Rathmines & Ranelagh (1896, renamed Ranelagh in 1921). In 1915, due to coastal erosion, the Westland Row line was moved inland south of Killiney, joining the Harcourt St. Line at the new relocated Shanganagh Junct.
The line continued to Woodbrook Halt (1910), which served the cricket ground on Sir Stanley Cochrane's Woodbrook estate. The Woodbrook Golf Club and Cricket Grounds later used this halt between 1920 and 1960.

The summit of the line was at Lakelands between Dundrum and Stillorgan.

One of the major engineering feats on the line was the Milltown Viaduct, or Nine Arches, which still stands today over the River Dodder. The 5-arched Bride's Glen Viaduct spans the Loughlinstown River valley and Bride's Glen Rd.

Decision to close
Following the Beddy Report of 1957, CIÉ decided to close all the non-profitable rural railway branch lines including the Harcourt Street line. In October 1958, CIÉ gave public notice of the closure. Many objections were raised by local people but to no avail. The last train, CIÉ 2600 Class AEC railcar number 2652, left Harcourt Street at 4:25pm on 31 December 1958. One interesting event that occurred was that when this train began crossing The Nine Arches Viaduct between Milltown and Dundrum, the staff of the nearby laundry turned out in force and blew sirens as the train crossed the viaduct for the last time. Following the closure, many of the stations were sold by public auction. The tracks were lifted between 1 January 1959 and September 1960.

Legacy
The route corridor remained mostly in place until the 2000s. The section between Grand Parade and the old Stillorgan station at Sandyford was chosen for use by the Luas light rail system whose Green Line opened in 2004. The line crosses the Dundrum bypass on the new William Dargan cable-stayed bridge.

An extension of the Luas to Cherrywood opened for passenger service on Saturday 16 October 2010, using most of the old railway alignment. The route leaves the old alignment after the Sandyford Depot, crosses the M50 motorway and runs down Ballyogan Road, before crossing the M50 again, and re-joining the original alignment before the Carrickmines station. The Railway Procurement Agency announced in 2009 that the Brennanstown stop would not open due to lack of local development. Beyond Brennanstown, the route diverges slightly from the old alignment and enters a new tunnel, before ending at the Brides Glen Luas stop in Cherrywood Business Park.

Visible remains
Several bridges, stations and much of the alignment have survived. These include the Harcourt Street Station, Dundrum, Stillorgan, Carrickmines and Shankill stations, Woodbrook Halt, the Nine Arches and Bride's Glen viaducts. Little trace of Foxrock railway station remains as the building was demolished in 1991, other than the original passenger entrance to Leopardstown Racecourse beside the golf club main gates.

See also
Harcourt Street railway station
History of rail transport in Ireland
Portobello

References

Sources

Citations

Transport in County Dublin
Closed railways in Ireland
1854 establishments in Ireland
1958 disestablishments in Ireland